The Bright Leaf Historic District  is a national historic district located at Durham, Durham County, North Carolina. It encompasses 22 contributing buildings and seven contributing structures in an industrial section of Durham.  The majority of the buildings were built from the 1870s to the World War II period, and are massive two- to four-story structures, usually rectangular in form with flat or very shallow gable roofs and of fireproof construction with brick exteriors.  Notable buildings include the B. L. Duke Warehouse (late 1870s), the Italianate style W. Duke Sons and Company Cigarette Factory (1884), Liggett and Myers Office Building, Chesterfield Building, Flowers Building (1916), Imperial Tobacco Company Factory (1916), White Warehouse (1926), and five Romanesque Revival style buildings built by The American Tobacco Company trust—Walker Warehouse (1897), Cobb Building (1898), O'Brien Building (1899), Hicks Warehouse (1903) and Toms Warehouse (1903).

It was listed on the National Register of Historic Places in 1999.

See also
 Watts and Yuille Warehouses
 2019 Durham gas explosion

References

External links

Brightleaf Square website

Tobacco buildings in the United States
Industrial buildings and structures on the National Register of Historic Places in North Carolina
Historic districts on the National Register of Historic Places in North Carolina
Italianate architecture in North Carolina
Romanesque Revival architecture in North Carolina
Historic districts in Durham, North Carolina
National Register of Historic Places in Durham County, North Carolina